Oru Cheru Punchiri (English: A Slender Smile) is a 2000 Malayalam film written and directed by M.T. Vasudevan Nair. This is his sixth film as a director. The film stars  Oduvil Unnikrishnan and Nirmala Sreenivasan in the lead roles. The film is based on Telugu writer Sriramana's short story Mithunam from the novel of the same title.

Plot
Oru Cheru Punchiri tells the story of a retired estate manager Krishna Kuruppu (Oduvil Unnikrishnan) in his mid seventies and his wife Ammalukutty (Nirmala Sreenivasan) in her mid sixties continuing their married life in a honeymoon mood. This couple wake up to  romantic mornings dense with sweet herbal aroma with the melodious music of birds as the background. They spend their time engaged in games of mischief and even some social activities that they could manage. They make it clear that they would never surrender to the plea of their children coated in love, to sell the ancestral property in the village and move to the city with them. They are happy doing agriculture in the land they own. They have some good neighbours in Janu (Roslyn), her daughter Malathi (sindhu) and helper-boy Kannan (Master Vignesh). Krishna Kuruppu was instrumental in Janu getting a sweeper's job in the Urban bank there. He also sponsors for Kannan's education. Krishna Kuruppu helps Bhaskaran (Jayakrishnan) get a job in the estate he worked. He also arranges the marriage of Bhaskaran and Malathi. He also supports the love affair of his granddaughter Beena (Lena) with a Muslim youth.

The movie ends with Ammalukutty's decision to continue with this celebration of life even after the death of Krishna Kuruppu.

Cast
 Oduvil Unnikrishnan as Krishna Kuruppu
 Nirmala Sreenivasan as Ammalukutty(Voice by Thankamani)
 Jayakrishnan as Bhaskaran
 Sindhu Shyam as Nirmala(Voice by Nithuna)
 P. K. Venukuttan Nair as Govindettan
 Aliyar as Postman Ramankutty
 Master Vignesh as Kannan
 Thampi Kannanthanam as Ravi
 Sreedevi Unni as Radha
 Paul as Kesu
 Manka Mahesh as Subhadra
 Lena as Beena
 Mukundan as Jayan
 Roslyn as Janu
 Vijayan Peringode as Paulose
 Sarada as Chinnamani

Soundtrack
This film has no songs.

Filming
The film was shot on the banks of the Periyar River at Parappuran, Puthiyedam, Chowwara, Sreemoolanagaram, and Aluva in Kochi, India.

Awards and recognitions
 Special mention at the FIPRESCI awards in 2000.
 Indian National Film Award for the Best Film on Environment Conservation/Preservation in 2001.
 The Kerala State Film Award for the best director of 2000.
 Screened at the third Mumbai International Film Festival in November 2000.
 Screened at the International Film Festival of Kerala in 2001.
 Selected for the Munich International Film Festival.
 last few scenes of the screen play of this movie has been included in the Malayalam textbook for class IX formulated by SCERT

References

External links
 
 OneIndia article
 Upperstall article

2000 films
2000s Malayalam-language films
Films scored by Johnson
Environmental films
Films with screenplays by M. T. Vasudevan Nair
Films shot in Kerala
Films shot in Kochi
Films about couples
Best Film on Environment Conservation/Preservation National Film Award winners
Films directed by M. T. Vasudevan Nair